Imaginary Cat is an 8-episode South Korean television series starring Yoo Seung-ho. It aired on cable network MBC Every 1, every Tuesday at 20:50 (KST) from November 24, 2015, to January 12, 2016.

Synopsis
The series tells the story of Hyun Jong-hyun, a stubborn part-time worker who dreams of being a webtoon writer, and his confidant, a stray cat named Bokgil.

Cast

Main
Yoo Seung-ho as Hyun Jong-hyun
Han Ye-ri as Bokgil (voice only)

Supporting

Cho Hye-jung as Oh Na-woo
Park Chul-min as Team Leader Ma Joo-im
Lee El as Dokgo Soon
Kim Min-seok as Yook Hae-gong
Solar as Jung Soo-in
Kim Hyun-joon as Park Jin-sung
Choi Tae-hwan as Lee Wan
Shim Min as Heo Gong-joo
Jun Hun-tae

References

External links
 

South Korean comedy-drama television series
MBC TV television dramas
2015 South Korean television series debuts
2016 South Korean television series endings
Television shows based on South Korean webtoons